Window seat may refer to:
Window seat (type of sofa), a miniature sofa without a back, intended to fill the recess of a window
 In vehicles, especially aircraft, a seat nearest the window – see airline seat

Other:
Window Seat (film), 2022 Indian film
"Window Seat" (song), a song by Erykah Badu
Window Seat, a song on Curve (Our Lady Peace album)
Window Seats, a Northern Ireland rock band